Mongoose is a cross-platform embedded web server and networking library.

The small footprint of the software enables any Internet-connected device to function as a web server.

Overview
Mongoose is built on top of the Mongoose Embedded Library which may be used inside of embedded devices. Mongoose is officially supported on Windows, MacOS, Linux, QNX, eCOS, FreeRTOS, Android and iOS.

References

Free software programmed in C
Web server software
Web server software for Linux